Scopula superior is a moth of the family Geometridae. It was described by Arthur Gardiner Butler in 1878. It is found in Japan, the Russian Far East and China.

References

Moths described in 1878
superior
Moths of Asia
Taxa named by Arthur Gardiner Butler